The following is a list of players who have achieved the most blocks during their WNBA careers.

All statistics are up to date as of the end of the 2022 WNBA season.

Progressive list of steal leaders
This is a progressive list of assist leaders showing how the record increased through the years.
Statistics accurate as of October 1, 2022.

See also
List of National Basketball Association career blocks leaders
List of National Basketball Association season blocks leaders

Notes

References

External links
WNBA Career Leaders and Records for Blocks | Basketball-Reference.com

Lists of Women's National Basketball Association players
Women's National Basketball Association statistics